Elachista pyrrha is a moth of the family Elachistidae. It is found in Canada, where it has been recorded from Alberta.

References

pyrrha
Moths described in 1996
Moths of North America